The FIVB World Grand Prix 2003 was the eleventh edition of the annual women's volleyball tournament, which is the female equivalent of the Men's Volleyball World League. The 2003 edition was played by twelve countries from July 21 to August 3, 2003 with the final round held in Andria, Italy. Hosts Italy and the top five ranked teams after the preliminary rounds qualified for the last round.

Competing nations

Qualification process

Calendar

Teams

Preliminary round

Group A

|}

|}

Group B

|}

|}

Final round

Pool Final

|}

Final ranking

|}

Overall ranking

Individual awards

Most Valuable Player:

Best Scorer:

Best Spiker:

Best Blocker:

Best Server:

Best Setter:

Dream Team

Setter:

Middle Blockers:

Outside Hitters:

Opposite Spiker:

References
 FIVB
 Results

FIVB World Grand Prix
2003 in Italian sport
V
2003